The 46th Telluride Film Festival took place from August 30 to September 2, 2019, in Telluride, Colorado, United States.

Author Pico Iyer was selected as the guest director of the event. Telluride honored Renée Zellweger, Adam Driver, and Philip Kaufman as the Silver Medallion winners. Sound studio Dolby Laboratories received the Special Medallion award.

Official selections

Main programme

Guest Director's Selections
The films were selected and presented by the year's guest director, Pico Iyer.

Filmmakers of Tomorrow

Student Prints
The selection was curated and introduced by Gregory Nava. It selected the best student-produced work around the world.

Calling Cards
The selection was curated by Barry Jenkins and presented by Nick O'Neill. It selected new works from promising filmmakers.

Great Expectations
The selection was curated by Barry Jenkins and presented by Nick O'Neill.

Backlot
The selection included behind-the-scene movies and portraits of artists, musicians, and filmmakers.

Festivities

Silver Medallion
Renée Zellweger
Adam Driver
Philip Kaufman

Special Medallion
Dolby Laboratories

References

External links
 

2019 film festivals
2019 in Colorado
46th